Elk Run is a small unincorporated community in Fauquier County, Virginia.  It is centered on State Route 806 and State Route 610. Prior to European settlement, the area was home to the Manahoac people.

It is famous among the locals for the historical Elk Run Church site built in the late 18th century.  All that remains is a foundation and the gravesites.  The church site is now the site of a commemorative park. Its first minister was James Keith, grandfather of Chief Justice John Marshall. He is buried at the church site.

The community is small, but active.  There is one commercial building serving the community.

The Elk Run Church site has been preserved and marked with historical information markers.

References

Unincorporated communities in Fauquier County, Virginia
Unincorporated communities in Virginia